Karl A. Roider Jr. is the Louisiana State University, Thomas and Lillian Landrum Alumni Professor. Roider joined the LSU faculty in 1968. He was appointed as the Dean of LSU's College of Arts and Sciences in December 1991 and served in this role for nine years. Roider returned to his role as a history professor before retiring in the spring of 2014.

Roider's academic specialization is in the study of the Balkans.  His books include The Reluctant Ally: Austria's Policy in the Austro-Turkish War, 1737-1739 (1972), Austria's Eastern Question, 1700-1790 (1982), Baron Thugut and Austria's Response to the French Revolution (1987), and a biography of Maria Theresa of Austria.

Education
Ada High School, 1961
A.B. Yale University 1965
M.A. Stanford University 1966 
Ph.D. Stanford University 1970

Awards and honors
Thomas and Lillian Landrum Alumni Professor of History
Younger Humanist Fellow, National Endowment for the Humanities
Fulbright Scholar
American Philosophical Society scholar
Ada Schools, Hall of Honor
Commander's Award for Public Service

Notable articles
Forewords to:
Ella Schneider Hilton, Displaced Person: A Girl's Life in Russia, Germany, and America (LSU Press, 2004)
E.M. Forster, ed., The Turkish Letters of Ogiev Ghiselin de Busberg (LSU Press, 2005)

Books
 The Reluctant Ally: Austria’s Policy in the Austro-Turkish War, 1737-1739 (Louisiana State University Press, 1972)
 Maria Theresa (Prentice-Hall, 1973—Editor)
 Austria’s Eastern Question, 1700-1790 (Princeton University Press, 1982)
 Baron Thugut and Austria’s Response to the French Revolution (Princeton University Press, 1987)

References

External links
 Dr. Karl Roider's commencement address to LSU College of Education and LSU School of Social Work graduates, faculty, family and friends on Friday, December 16, 2011.

Living people
Year of birth missing (living people)